Barbie Dreamhouse Adventures, Barbie: Dreamhouse Adventures or just Dreamhouse Adventures, is a CGI-animated adventure comedy children's streaming television series released between May 3, 2018 and April 12, 2020 on Netflix in the United States, while in Canada, it premiered on YTV on June 22, 2018.

Originally created to complement the Barbie: Dreamtopia web-based franchise, the series is rather centered on the activities and adventures of Barbie, her sisters, other family members and friends, and it follows up from the 2017 film, Barbie: Dolphin Magic. The series' 4th and 5th seasons were referred to on-screen as Barbie Dreamhouse Adventures: Go Team Roberts!  With the series release wrapped up on Netflix, it got adapted into 4 streaming television films which featured a portion of the core family and friends going along with Barbie on certain adventures.

Background
According to Mattel's then-chief content officer, (CCO), Catherine Balsam Schwaber, and Senior Vice President of content development & production, Christopher Keenan, the series was in response to kids wanting to know more about the iconic character, her sisters and her entire family and friends.

Broadcast
The TV show premiered on May 3, 2018 as a Netflix original in episode bundles referred to as "seasons". Each "season" consists of 8 episodes which was released at certain dates and varied in countries and territories worldwide. The series premiered on YTV in Canada on June 22, Pop in the UK and Ireland on October 22, all in 2018, Gulli in France and Super RTL in Germany, the latter two with local-dubbing replacements. The second season of 8 episodes premiered on the streaming service on September 13, 2018, and the third season on February 14, 2019. As Barbie Dreamhouse Adventures: Go Team Roberts!, the fourth season premiered on November 1, 2019 and the fifth and final season premiered on January 19, 2020 and concluded on April 12, 2020.

Cast
America Young as Barbie Roberts
Elli Moore as the singing voice of Barbie
Kirsten Day as Skipper Roberts, Barbie's oldest sister. She is a smart teenager who loves technology and DJing.
Cassandra Lee Morris as Stacie Roberts, Barbie's second youngest sister. She is funny, creative and a talented athlete.
Cassidy Naber as Chelsea Roberts, Barbie's youngest sister. She is the more imaginative of the Roberts girls.
Ritesh Rajan as Ken Carson, Barbie's best friend and the Roberts' longtime neighbor. He wants to become a marine biologist.
Desirae Whitfield as Nikki Watkins, Barbie's African-American best friend, who is into fashion.
Cristina Milizia as Teresa Rivera, Barbie's Latina best friend, who is an aspiring singer and songwriter. She is also a straight-A student and gymnast.
Stephanie Sheh as Renee Chow, Barbie's Chinese-American best friend and a main character in the franchise since Barbie: Spy Squad. Her relatives live in China.
Emma Galvin as Daisy Costopolis, Barbie's curvy best friend who likes Scratch Djing and has pink hair. Daisy inspired Skipper to be a Scratch DJ.
Lisa Fuson as Margaret Roberts, Barbie, Skipper, Stacie, and Chelsea's mom, and Poppy Reardon, an antagonistic neighbor.
Greg Chun as George Roberts, Barbie, Skipper, Stacie, and Chelsea's dad.
Johnny Yong Bosch as Whittaker Reardon, Poppy's husband.
Eamon Brennan as Trevelian Finknoddle "Trey" Reardon, Poppy and Whittaker's only son. He is selfish and calls himself the king of Malibu.

Others
Tara Sands as Dreamhouse Door
Kirsten Day as Ben, Teresa's phone, and Tammy Bounceaway, an Asian-American rival of Barbie.
Benjamin Diskin as Greg
Rhomeyn Johnson as Johnny Bee
Cassidy Naber as Young Barbie and Honey, Chelsea's female puppy
Megan Jameson as Rookie, Stacie's sporty male puppy
AJ Hudson as DJ, Skipper's music-influenced puppy
Kaitlyn McCormick as Taffy, Barbie's youngest puppy
Charlie Diecker as Jonny
Cristina Milizia as Baby Bonnie and Mew Mew
Johnny Yong Bosch as Mr. Guerrero
Ogie Banks as Ned and Ted Johnson, Trey's twin best friends also known as "The Dudes"
Ben Pronsky as Henric Henricson, Rufus, and Narrator
Nakia Burrise as Principal Miller
Spike Spencer as Jonathan and Harry Havarti

Episodes

Season 1 (2018)

Season 2 (2018)

Season 3 (2019)

Season 4 (2019)
From this season until its end, the series was titled Barbie Dreamhouse Adventures: Go Team Roberts on-screen.

Season 5 (2020)

Films
With the series wrapped up on 12 April 2020, Mattel Television expanded the TV series into television films, which like the series premiered on Netflix as "television specials" and were then picked up for television broadcast in certain countries. The first film from 2017, Barbie: Dolphin Magic, not only served as the pilot for the series, but returned Barbie to the streaming service since the 2012–15 web series, Barbie: Life in the Dreamhouse. The second film revived the well-known Barbie film franchise which was put on a hiatus after the release of the first film and permanently made the streaming service the destination for upcoming and newer Barbie content in the United States.

See also
 List of Barbie films
 Barbie Dreamtopia
 Barbie: Dolphin Magic
 Barbie: It Takes Two
 Barbie: Epic Road Trip

Notes

References

External links
Production website

Barbie Dreamhouse Adventures Seasons 1–3 and as  Go Team Roberts! on Netflix
Barbie Dreamhouse Adventures at Common Sense Media

Barbie television series
2010s American animated television series
2020s American animated television series
2018 American television series debuts
2010s Canadian animated television series
2020s Canadian animated television series
2018 Canadian television series debuts
American children's animated comedy television series
American computer-animated television series
Canadian children's animated comedy television series
Canadian computer-animated television series
English-language Netflix original programming
Netflix children's programming
Television series by Mattel Creations
Television shows set in California